The Toyota FA and BA were heavy duty trucks introduced in February 1954. They were facelifted versions of the earlier BX/FX trucks, retaining those trucks Type B and Type F six-cylinder petrol engines. The first letter in the model name indicates the engine family fitted; in 1957 the Type D diesel engine was introduced in a model known as the DA. The second letter indicated the size of the truck, with shorter medium duty versions being coded BC/FC/DC. A second letter "B" was used on bus versions of this chassis. A second generation FA/DA was introduced in 1964 and was built in Japan until 1980, when Hino replaced Toyota's heavier truck lines entirely. The DA, however, was also built in numerous other countries and manufacture continued into the first decade of the 21st century.

First generation (1954)

Introduced in February 1954, the original models were  trucks (BA and FA respectively) on a  wheelbase. The BA's  Type B engine still produced  at 3000 rpm. In March the  BC model was added, followed by the F-engined FC in June. The BC and FC have a  wheelbase and were often used as tractor units.

The heavier FA sold very well in a changing Japanese trucking market which was moving to larger loads and greater distances. Accordingly, in September 1954 Toyota lengthened the FA's chassis and upgraded it to carry 5 tonnes, renaming it the FA5. The smaller BA and BC were discontinued in February and July 1956, being quetly succeded by the Toyota Stout. Also in February 1956, the FA5 was facelifted with a wider grille and equipped with a transmission with synchromesh on second through fourth gear (a first for the segment in Japan) and renamed the FA60. Simultaneously, the lighter FC received similar changes, becoming the FC60 in the process. Along with a payload upgrade to  it was renamed the FC80 in November 1959. This was kept in production until September 1964, when it was replaced by the second generation FC100. The FA60 became the FA70 in January 1958, with the same engine upgrade as for the FC70. The heavier part of the F-engined range was split into two in September 1959, with the FA80 and FA90 being built to handle  respectively; these model codes were again maintained until the first generation was replaced.

In March 1957 the diesel-engined DA60 was introduced. The all new "D" engine was a pre-combustion diesel straight-six displacing  and producing  at 2600 rpm. The DA60 also prompted Toyota to introduce the new Toyota Diesel Store sales network, which remained until 1988 and was the exclusive distributor of Toyota's diesel-engined vehicles in Japan. This became the DA70 at the beginning of 1958. As with the petrol-engined models, the diesel lineup was split into the 5-tonne DA80 and the 6-tonne DA90 in September 1959. Unlike the petrol-engined models, however, the 6-tonne diesels also received a new, larger and more powerful engine. The 2D displaces  and produces . Some diesel-engined models carry an "H" suffix (such as a DA90-H); this signifies a model with a two-speed rear axle, giving a total of eight forward speeds.

Appearance
In late 1959 the lineup was refreshed and the grille was changed to incorporate two yellow marker lights. In late 1961 (for the 1962 model year) the range was facelifted again, with a single-piece curved windshield replacing the earlier split unit. This was Japan's first heavy truck with such a fitment. At the same time, the grille was stamped directly with widely spaced "TOYOTA" lettering rather than having chromed letters mounted to a red bar as earlier.

Cabover trucks
With the sales of bonneted trucks slowing down in Japan at this time, reflecting ever more congested city streets, Toyota developed a  cab-over version on a  wheelbase. Based on the medium-duty FC80 model, the new DC80C was presented in October 1963, fitted with the D-type diesel engine and a tilting cab. As with the bonneted models, the 5.9-liter D-type six-cylinder engine develops . Because the engine was mounted between the seats, the cabover model could only take two occupants. The DC80C initially sold very well, but problems with the drivetrain as well as the chassis meant that it soon lost out to its competitors. The cabovers received a facelift in September 1966. The 4-ton cabover trucks were both replaced by the new Toyota Massy Dyna in September 1969.

Second generation (1964)

Appearing in September 1964, the second generation adopted a new squared-off cab with twin headlights. The longest wheelbase was installed in the 115-series, the shorter ones were 100- and 110-series. The chassis was modified for increased rigidity and the suspension was strengthened. The glass area of the cabin was increased and a dished steering wheel was adopted for safety. These moves were intended to make the truck a more capable proposition on Japan's newly developed highways.

At the time of introduction, there were six main models available: The 100-series is a  truck, fitted with either the F or the D engine. A month after the heavy-duty models, the  FC100 was introduced. The diesel unit, however, offered considerably higher torque, at  versus . In June 1965, the extra long-wheelbase, 6-tonne DA116 was introduced.

The FC100 was taken out of production in March 1974. Around this time, the series was also facelifted. The new models have a grille with four central openings flanked by six openings on either side, rather than the earlier seven-bar grille. The engine badges were removed from the front fenders, and the identification script between the door and the bonnet now read simply "TOYOTA" rather than TOYOTA 5000 or 6000 depending on the weight rating. In January 1975, petrol-engined FAs changed over to the 4.2-liter 2F engine. In April 1977 the 2D engine was thoroughly overhauled, to further increase reliability over the earlier, somewhat troublesome Toyota diesels.

Japanese production of the second generation DA/FA ended in 1978 in favor of subsidiary brand Hino Motors. The DA/FA was also assembled in several other countries, however, including but not limited to Indonesia, Thailand, Kenya, and South Africa. In Indonesia it was nicknamed "Toyota Buaya" (Alligator Toyota), a reference to the alligator-style bonnet. Indonesian sales began in 1969 under the auspices of Astra International until the formation of the Toyota Astra Motor (TAM) joint venture in 1971. TAM built a dedicated plant for the FA/DA in 1973 and exported SKD kits to various countries, including Nigeria and Australia. Indonesian models were facelifted in 1976 and post-facelift models were painted moss green as standard; they continued in local production until 1986.

Kenyan assembly began in 1977, while South African-made trucks began using locally made engines in May 1982. Production in South Africa continued until 2001, over twenty years after Japanese manufacture had ended.

Cabover trucks
There was also a cabover  version, called the FA115C or DA115C depending on engine fitment. The DA115C was kept in production until February 1980. It thus outlived the bonneted FA/DA-series which it preceded. The 6-tonne cabovers have a longer cab to accommodate a small sleeping area behind the front seats. There are also period brochures from 1963/1964 showing a  model called the DA95C, using the 2D engine and a version of the DA115C cab with unusual additional small windows flanking the grille.

References

Vehicles introduced in 1954
FA
Rear-wheel-drive vehicles